Sophida Jiratritarn (née Kanchanarin; , nicknamed Ning; born 1995) is a Thai beauty pageant titleholder and banker who won Miss Universe Thailand 2018 and represented Thailand at the Miss Universe 2018 pageant in Bangkok, ending as a Top 10 finalist.

Biography
Sophida Kanchanarin, in a Thai Chinese household in Bangkok. Her father was a doctor at Phramongkutklao Hospital. She travelled overseas for further education, and graduated after majoring in finance, with a degree in Business Administration from the University of Nevada, Las Vegas.

After returning to Thailand she became an investment banking manager at TMB Bank.

In July 2019, she married Trinupab Jiratritarn at the Plaza Athenee Bangkok Hotel in Thailand. On April 2, 2020, Jiratritarn gave birth to the couple's first child, a son.

Pageantry

Miss Universe Thailand 2018
Sophida won the Miss Universe Thailand 2018 title on Saturday, 30 June 2018 at Royal Paragon Hall, Siam Paragon, replacing outgoing Maria Poonlertlarp Miss Universe Thailand 2017. She received a cash prize of 1,000,000฿ (one million baht), a diamond crown, jewellery, a new car and other prizes.  Miss Universe Thailand was the only pageant she had ever competed in.

Miss Universe 2018
Sophida attended the Miss Universe 2018 pageant in Bangkok, Thailand as she won Miss universe Thailand 2018 and finished in the Top 10. She wore a dress designed by Princess Sirivannavari Nariratana.

References

External links
 Miss Universe Thailand website
 

Sophida Kanchanarin
1995 births
Living people
Sophida Kanchanarin
Miss Universe 2018 contestants
Sophida Kanchanarin
Sophida Kanchanarin
University of Nevada, Las Vegas alumni
Sophida Kanchanarin
Sophida Kanchanarin
Sophida Kanchanarin